Jajang (also Romanized as Jājang and Jājeng; also known as Chāchīng, Gājīn, and Jachang) is a village in Darmian Rural District, in the Central District of Darmian County, South Khorasan Province, Iran. At the 2006 census, its population was 197, in 53 families.

References 

Populated places in Darmian County